Peter Delaney may refer to:
 Peter Delaney (priest) (born 1939), Anglican priest from Great Britain
 Peter Delaney (rower) (born 1941), New Zealand rower
 Peter V. Delaney (1935 – 2005), Irish colorectal surgeon

See also
 Peter Delanoy (fl. 1680s–1690s), Mayor of New York City